The Mayor of San Jose, officially the Mayor of the City of San José, is executive of the Government of the City of San Jose, California in the United States.

The mayor presides over the San Jose City Council, which is composed of 11 voting members, including the mayor. While the mayor is the head of the city council, they have no veto powers over legislation passed by the Council, as the city uses a council-manager form of government. The mayor serves a four-year term and is limited to two successive terms.

There are 65 people who have served as mayor in San Jose since 1850, when California became a state following the American Conquest of California. Prior to the conquest, Californios served as Mayor of San Jose during the Spanish and Mexican eras since 1777. The current mayor is Democrat Matt Mahan, who took office in January 2023.

List

Mayors prior to 1850

Mayors since 1850

Before 1967, mayors of San Jose were nominated and elected by the San Jose City Council.

Josiah Belden 1850–1851
Thomas White 1851–1854
O. H. Allen 1854–1855
Sherman Otis Houghton 1855–1856
Lawrence Archer 1856
John M. Murphy 1856
George Givens 1856–1857
Ranson G. Moody 1857–1858
Peter O. Minor 1858–1859
Thomas Fallon 1859–1860
Richard B. Buckner 1860–1861
Joseph W. Johnson 1861–1863
John Alonzo Quinby 1863–1868
Mark Leavenworth 1868–1870
Adolph Pfister 1870–1873
Bernard D. Murphy 1873–1877
George B. McKee 1877–1878
Lawrence Archer 1878–1880
Bernard D. Murphy 1880–1882
Charles J. Martin 1882–1884
Campbell Thompson Settle 1884–1886
Charles W. Breyfogle 1886–1887
Samuel Watson Boring 1887–1890
Samuel N. Rucker 1890–1894
Paul P. Austin 1894–1896
Valentine Koch 1896–1898
Charles J. Martin 1898–1902
George D. Worswick 1902–1906
Henry D. Mathews 1906–1908
Charles W. Davison 1908–1910
Thomas Monahan 1910–1914
Fred R. Husted 1914–1916
Elmer E. Chase 1916–1918 1
Charles M. O'Brian 1918–1920
Albert C. Jayet 1920–1922
M. E. Arnerich 1922–1924
Joseph T. Brooks 1924–1926
Dan W. Gray 1926–1928
Fred Doerr 1928–1930
W. L. Biebrach 1930–1932
A. M. Meyer 1932–1934
Charles Bishop 1934–1936
Richard French 1936–1938
Clyde L. Fischer 1938–1940
Harry Young 1940–1944
Earl Campbell 1944–1945
Ernie Renzel 1945–1946
Albert J. Ruffo 1946–1948
Fred Watson 1948–1950
Clark L. Bradley 1950–1952
Parker Hathaway 1952–1954
George Starbird 1954–1956
Robert Doerr 1956–1958
Louis Solari 1958–1960
Paul Moore 1960–1962
Robert Welch 1962–1964
Joseph L. Pace 1964–1967

Popularly elected mayors (1967-present)

Since 1967, San Jose has elected its mayors by a popular vote. Due to state laws regarding primary elections, political parties cannot nominate candidates for mayor, although candidates often choose to identify with a party. All registered candidates, regardless of party affiliation, compete in an election held in June of even numbered years which are non-leap years. If no person gets over 50% of the popular vote, the top two candidates automatically move to a runoff election. Mayors are limited to two terms.

All elected mayors of San Jose have been members of the Democratic Party. The first elected mayor was Ron James and the first female mayor was Janet Gray Hayes.

Other offices held
Many mayors of San Jose have either served in other public offices or been influential in the private sector following their tenures. Norman Mineta subsequently became a congressman, U.S. Secretary of Commerce and U.S. Secretary of Transportation. Mayor Ron Gonzales served as Mayor and Councilmember of the City of Sunnyvale prior to being elected to the Santa Clara County Board of Supervisors where he was elected to serve as a County Supervisor before his election to the San Jose City Council where he serve two terms as Mayor.

Chuck Reed served as an elected member to the San Jose City Council for four consecutive terms. Two as the District 4 representative and two terms as Mayor. He was also appointed to the San Jose Planning Commission.  
The following is a list of statewide or federal public offices held by mayors before or after their term(s).

See also
 Timeline of San Jose, California

References

Arbuckle, Clyde; Clyde Arbuckle's History of San Jose; 1985
Pioneers who made a difference
San Jose case study, part one, the urban growth boundary

Notes
1Elmer E. Chase was the first mayor who was not the city's chief executive; the city moved to a council-manager government corresponding to his election.  Chase and all following mayors are simply the president of the city council.

History of San Jose, California
San Jose, California

Mayors
1850 establishments in California